Abivirutheeswaram is a village in the Kudavasal taluk of Tiruvarur district, Tamil Nadu, India.

Demographics 

As per the 2001 census, Abivirutheeswaram  had a total population of 1432 with 657 males and 775 females. The sex ratio was 1180. The literacy rate was 74.8.

References 

 

Villages in Tiruvarur district